ProKennex is a Taiwanese manufacturer of racquet sports equipment for tennis, squash, badminton, racquetball, and pickleball. The company enjoyed wide global distribution in the 1980s, when manufacturing in Taiwan was booming due to domestic economic conditions. Parent company Kunnan Enterprise Ltd. has faced financial difficulties since the mid 1990s, leading to a contraction of the ProKennex name globally.  Today, the company focuses on a niche set of consumers interested in technology advancements in racquet sports. The company focuses on this aspect of its products by promoting itself as a "science and design company", rather than a standard racket manufacturer.

History
The origins of the company began in 1965 when Lo Kunnan, the son of a plastic toy gun manufacturer, began producing wooden badminton racquets in the backyard of his father's house. In 1968, Lo moved on to producing wooden tennis racquets, followed by aluminum racquets in 1973.

In 1978, Lo launched sporting goods company Kunnan Enterprises Ltd., with ProKennex as its racquet brand. According to the company website ProKennex made history in 1980 by making the world's first mid-size graphite tennis racquet, followed by the world's first graphite squash racquet in 1983.

References

External links
 

1978 establishments in Taiwan
Companies based in Taichung
Manufacturing companies established in 1978
Tennis equipment manufacturers
Sporting goods manufacturers of Taiwan
Taiwanese brands